Tekmeh Dash District is in Bostanabad County, East Azerbaijan province, Iran. At the 2006 census, its population was 27,051 in 5,914 households. The following census in 2011 counted 24,366 people in 6,705 households. At the latest census in 2016, the district had 22,545 inhabitants living in 6,782 households.

References 

Bostanabad County

Districts of East Azerbaijan Province

Populated places in East Azerbaijan Province

Populated places in Bostanabad County